Newton Friends' Meetinghouse is the home of an active meeting of the Religious Society of Friends, who meet in a historic Quaker meeting house at 808 Cooper Street in Camden, Camden County, New Jersey, United States.

It was built in 1824 as an extremely simple "Quaker clapboard" structure in the typically subdued style of Quaker meeting houses. It was remodeled in 1885 by architect Wilson Eyre, Jr. in the sometimes-extravagant Queen Anne Revival style, though this expression of the style is still very subdued.   The meetinghouse was added to the National Register of Historic Places in 1971.

See also
National Register of Historic Places listings in Camden County, New Jersey

References

External links
Photograph of the meetinghouse
Official site

Quaker meeting houses in New Jersey
Churches on the National Register of Historic Places in New Jersey
Churches completed in 1824
Churches in Camden County, New Jersey
Buildings and structures in Camden, New Jersey
National Register of Historic Places in Camden County, New Jersey